Tommaso Goi (born January 8, 1990) is an Italian former professional ice hockey player who last played under contract with HC Ambrì-Piotta of the Swiss National League (NL) and the Italian national team.

He participated at the 2017 IIHF World Championship.

References

External links

1990 births
Living people
Italian ice hockey forwards
Sportspeople from Varese
Italian expatriate ice hockey people
Italian expatriate sportspeople in Switzerland
HC Ambrì-Piotta players
HC Gardena players
HC Lugano players
HC Sierre players
HCB Ticino Rockets players